The Gamble  (originally titled La partita) is a 1988 Italian comedy film directed by Carlo Vanzina.  It was shot in Rome and Venice. The film is based on the novel with the same name written by Alberto Ongaro. It was generally panned by critics.

Cast 
Matthew Modine as Francesco Sacredo
Faye Dunaway as Countess Matilda Von Wallenstein
Jennifer Beals as Lady Olivia Candioni
Ian Bannen as Francesco's father
Corinne Cléry as Jacqueline
Federica Moro as Lucrezia
Ana Obregón as the actress
Feodor Chaliapin, Jr. as Federico
Jacques Herlin as Old fiancé of Olivia
Karina Huff as Blond Maid
Gianfranco Barra as Manolo 
Vernon Wells as First Brother Podestà

References

External links

1988 films
Italian romantic comedy films
1988 romantic comedy films
Films directed by Carlo Vanzina
Films set in Venice
Films set in the 18th century
Films scored by Pino Donaggio
1980s English-language films
English-language Italian films
1980s Italian-language films
1988 multilingual films
Italian multilingual films
1980s Italian films